A chemical oxygen generator is a device that releases oxygen via a chemical reaction. The oxygen source is usually an inorganic superoxide, chlorate, or perchlorate; ozonides are a promising group of oxygen sources.  The generators are usually ignited by a firing pin, and the chemical reaction is usually exothermic, making the generator a potential fire hazard. Potassium superoxide was used as an oxygen source on early crewed missions of the Soviet space program, in submarines for use in emergency situations, for firefighters, and for mine rescue.

In commercial airliners 

Commercial aircraft provide emergency oxygen to passengers to protect them in case of loss of cabin pressure. Chemical oxygen generators are not used for the cockpit crew, who are typically supplied using compressed oxygen canisters, also known as oxygen bottles. In narrow body airliners, for each row of seats there were overhead oxygen masks and oxygen generators. In some wide-body airliners, such as the DC-10 and IL-96, the canisters and oxygen masks were mounted in the top portion of the seat backs, since the ceiling was too high above the passengers. If a decompression occurred, the panels were opened either by an automatic pressure switch or by a manual switch, and the masks were released. When the passengers pulled down on the mask they removed the retaining pins and triggered the production of oxygen.

The oxidizer core is sodium chlorate (NaClO3), which is mixed with less than 5
percent barium peroxide (BaO2) and less than 1 percent potassium perchlorate (KClO4). The explosives in the percussion cap are a lead styphnate and tetrazene explosive mixture. The chemical reaction is exothermic and the exterior temperature of the canister will reach . It will produce oxygen for 12 to 22 minutes.

Accidental activation of improperly shipped expired generators, mistakenly labeled as empty, caused the ValuJet Airlines Flight 592 crash, killing all on board. An ATA DC-10, Flight 131, was also destroyed while parked at O'Hare Airport, on August 10, 1986. The cause was the accidental activation of an oxygen canister, contained in the back of a broken DC-10 seat, being shipped in the cargo compartment to a repair station. There were no fatalities or injuries because the plane contained no passengers when the fire broke out.

Oxygen candle
The mixture has an indefinite shelf life if stored properly: candles have been stored for 20 years without decreased oxygen output. Thermal decomposition releases the oxygen. The burning iron supplies the heat. The candle must be wrapped in thermal insulation to maintain the reaction temperature and to protect surrounding equipment. The key reaction is:
2 NaClO3  →  2 NaCl  +  3 O2

Potassium and lithium chlorate, and sodium, potassium and lithium perchlorates can also be used in oxygen candles.

The candle had become contaminated with hydraulic oil, which caused the mixture to explode rather than burn.

In the Vika oxygen generator used on some spacecraft, lithium perchlorate is the source of oxygen. At 400 °C, it releases 60% of its weight as oxygen:
LiClO4  →  LiCl  +  2 O2

Pressure swing adsorption (PSA) oxygen generators

Advances in technology have provided industrial oxygen generator systems for use where air is available and a higher concentration of oxygen is desired. Pressure swing adsorption (PSA) incorporates a material called molecular sieve for gas separation. In the case of oxygen generation a zeolite-based sieve forces preferential adsorption for nitrogen. Clean, dry air is passed through the sieve beds on the oxygen generator, producing an oxygen-enriched gas.  Nitrogen separation membrane equipment is also used.

Uses
Chemical oxygen generators are used in aircraft, breathing apparatus for firefighters and mine rescue crews, submarines, and everywhere a compact emergency oxygen generator with long shelf life is needed. They usually contain a device for absorption of carbon dioxide, sometimes a filter filled with lithium hydroxide; a kilogram of LiOH absorbs about half a kilogram of CO2.
Self-contained oxygen generators (SCOGs) are used in submarines.
Self-contained self-rescue devices (SCSRs) are used to facilitate escape from mines.
On the International Space Station, chemical oxygen generators are used as a backup supply. Each canister can produce enough oxygen for one crewmember for one day.

See also
Oxygen storage
SolidOx (welding)

References

Human spaceflight
Firefighting equipment
Submarine design
Oxygen
Gas technologies